Lukáš Lacko and Ante Pavić were the defending champions, but chose not defend their title.

Sergey Betov and Mikhail Elgin won the title defeating Andre Begemann and Artem Sitak in the final 6–4, 6–4.

Seeds

Draw

References
 Main Draw

Tashkent Challenger - Doubles
2015 - Doubles